The Macao Water Supply Company Limited (Portuguese: Sociedade de Abastecimento de Águas de Macau) or Macao Water (Portuguese: SAAM) in short, is a company dealing with water supply in Macau, China.

History
Macao Water was originally established in 1932 as a private company in Portuguese Macau. On 1 August 1935, the company became the subsidiary of Macao Electricity Lighting Co. Ltd (MELCO) after the government and MELCO signed a 60-year concession contract. In 1982, the company was reorganized the rapid growth needs of water for Macau population. In June 1985, Sino-French Holdings (Hong Kong) Limited took over Macao Water with 85% equity.

Organizational structures
 Executive Team
 Finance
 Administration and Human Resources
 Information Services
 Laboratory and Research Center
 Operations
 Automation and Maintenance
 Infrastructure Project
 Customer Services
 Corporate Communications
 Performance Management

See also
 Energy in Macau

References

Macau
Public utilities
Companies of Macau
Companies established in 1932
1932 establishments in Macau